The Central District of Jam County is in Bushehr province, Iran. At the 2006 census, its population was 28,535 in 6,315 households. The following census in 2011 counted 40,428 people in 10,995 households. At the latest census in 2016, the district had 57,037 inhabitants living in 16,373 households.

References 

Districts of Bushehr Province
Populated places in Jam County